Live Trax is a series of live albums released by Dave Matthews Band's Bama Rags label. The albums in the series feature performances by Dave Matthews Band and also Dave Matthews and Tim Reynolds. The majority of the releases are not sold in commercial stores, but rather by means of order or download from the band's official website. The name Live Trax is a reference to the former Trax Nightclub in Charlottesville, Virginia, where the band played over one-hundred twenty shows during their early years from 1991-1996.

Only the sixth volume of the series was sold outside of the band's website, due to a high demand in the Boston, Massachusetts area. The album was sold in stores in addition to the band's online store. In July 2007, Starbucks released a nine-track compilation of the series, simply titled Live Trax, featuring selected tracks from the first nine volumes of the series.

List of albums

References

External links
Official Live Trax series page

Album series
Dave Matthews Band live albums